Rebecca Amuge Otengo is a Ugandan politician. As of 2017, she was appointed as Uganda's Ambassador to Ethiopia and Djibouti with residence in Addis Ababa. This position also makes her Uganda's Permanent Representative to the African Union (AU), Intergovernmental Authority on Development (IGAD) as well as UNECA She is the former State Minister for Northern Uganda in the Cabinet of Uganda. She was appointed to that position on 27 May 2011. Rebecca Amuge was an elected Member of Parliament as  Alebtong District Women's Representative.

Background and education
Rebecca Amuge was born on 26 April 1966 in the Lango sub-region, in Northern Uganda. She attended St. Katherine Girls' Secondary School for her O-Level studies, before transferring to Dr. Obote College in Lira, for her A-Level education. In 1990 she obtained the Diploma in Business Studies from what was known as the Uganda College of Commerce, but is now known as Makerere University Business School. In 2008, she obtained the degree of Bachelor of Arts in Human Resource Management from Makerere University, Uganda's oldest public university. That same year she was awarded the Certificate in Administrative Law by the Law Development Centre. In 2010 Makerere University awarded her the degree of Master of Science in Human Resources Management.

Career
Amuge Otengo began her career in 1991 as the Personnel Manager/Trainer at Sun-Set Group, serving in that capacity until 1993. She then worked as a personnel instructor at the Church of Uganda provincial project in Jinja, from 1993 until 1995. Between 1996 and 2001 she was the Project Coordinator at Church of Uganda, Lango Diocese. From 2002 until 2006, she served as the Vice Chairperson of Lango District Local Government. In 2006, she was elected to Parliament to represent women in Lira District, serving from 2006 until 2011. In 2011 she contested for the parliamentary seat of Women's Representative for newly created Alebtong District and was elected. In May 2011, she was appointed Minister of State for Northern Uganda; she replaced David Wakinona, who was appointed State Minister for Trade and Antiquities.

Other considerations
Rebecca Amuge Otengo is a married mother. She belongs to the National Resistance Movement political party.

See also
Cabinet of Uganda
Parliament of Uganda
Northern Uganda

References

External links
 Full List of Ugandan Cabinet Ministers May 2011

Living people
Government ministers of Uganda
1966 births
Members of the Parliament of Uganda
National Resistance Movement politicians
People from Alebtong District
21st-century Ugandan women politicians
21st-century Ugandan politicians
Women government ministers of Uganda
Women members of the Parliament of Uganda